The 2009–10 All-Ireland Junior Club Football Championship was the ninth staging of the All-Ireland Junior Club Football Championship since its establishment by the Gaelic Athletic Association.

The All-Ireland final was played on 14 February 2010 at Croke Park in Dublin, between Castlegregory and Kiltimagh. Castlegregory won the match by 1-14 to 0-15 to claim their first ever championship title.

All-Ireland Junior Club Football Championship

All-Ireland final

References

2009 in Irish sport
2010 in Irish sport
All-Ireland Junior Club Football Championship
All-Ireland Junior Club Football Championship